

This is a list of the National Register of Historic Places listings in Kingfisher County, Oklahoma.

This is intended to be a complete list of the properties on the National Register of Historic Places in Kingfisher County, Oklahoma, United States. The locations of National Register properties for which the latitude and longitude coordinates are included below, may be seen in a map.

There are 10 properties listed on the National Register in the county.

Current listings

|}

See also

 List of National Historic Landmarks in Oklahoma
 National Register of Historic Places listings in Oklahoma

References
For more information on the Seay Mansion, go to http://www.ctokmuseum.org/ 

 
Kingfisher County
Buildings and structures in Kingfisher County, Oklahoma